Year 203 (CCIII) was a common year starting on Saturday (link will display the full calendar) of the Julian calendar. At the time, it was known as the Year of the Consulship of Plautianus and Geta (or, less frequently, year 956 Ab urbe condita). The denomination 203 for this year has been used since the early medieval period, when the Anno Domini calendar era became the prevalent method in Europe for naming years.

Events 
 By place 

 Roman Empire 
 Emperor Septimius Severus rebuilds Byzantium, and expands the southern frontier of Africa, with the metropolis Carthage re-fortified.
 Gaius Fulvius Plautianus and Publius Septimius Geta become Roman Consuls.
 An arch dedicated to Septimius Severus is erected near the Forum.
 The Portico of Octavia is reconstructed.

 India 
 Prince Vijaya becomes king of the Andhra Empire. During his reign, the empire is broken apart into smaller independent principalities.

 China 
 Battle of Xiakou: Warlord Sun Quan battles his rival Huang Zu along the Yangtze River near Wuhan.

 By topic 

 Religion 
 Origen of Alexandria replaces Clement as the head of the Christian school in Alexandria.

Births 
 Zhuge Ke, Chinese general and politician (d. 253)

Deaths 
 Eulpaso, Korean official and Prime-Minister
 Ling Cao, Chinese general under Sun Ce
 Perpetua and Felicity, Christian martyrs
 Sun Yi, Chinese general and politician (b. 184)
 Wu Jing, Chinese general under Sun Ce

References